Liqhobong is a community council located in the Butha-Buthe District of Lesotho. Its population in 2006 was 5,524.

Villages
The community of Liqhobong includes the villages of Boiketsiso, Ha 'Makhoshane, Ha Jesi, Ha Keletso (Mafika-Lisiu), Ha Khaketla (Seqhobong), Ha Mabitle, Ha Makai, Ha Mohau, Ha Mok'hobo, Ha Molisana, Ha Mothae, Ha Motheane, Ha Motšoene, Ha Nchoatla, Ha Ntoro, Ha Ntsoebe, Ha Sefako, Ha Sekoati (Phahleng), Ha Tšoeunyana, Kholokoe, Libono, Liqobong, Makanyaneng, Manoeleng, Mantšonyana, Maqokoeng, Masetleng, Phamong, Pitsaneng, Pitseng and Saballa.

References

External links
 Google map of community villages

Populated places in Butha-Buthe District